DYuSSh Smena-Zenit, also known as FC Zenit academy or formerly DYuSSh Smena, is a Russian youth football academy based in Saint Petersburg. It is currently headed by Dutchman Henk van Stee.

History 
The sports school was founded in 1957 as a football section of Central DYuSSh GORONO of Leningrad. It was reorganized into Football SDYuShOR Smena in 1968.

Present 
In 2008 Smena was included into club structure of FC Zenit and renamed Smena-Zenit. Since 2010 academy's main U-18 team plays the role of Zenit dissolved farm club FC Smena-Zenit, competing in the championship of Saint Petersburg as well as various international tournaments.

The list of academy's coaches includes former internationals Aleksandr Spivak and Dmitry Vasilyev.

Alumni 
The best known alumni of Smena are Russia national football team players Vyacheslav Malafeev, Igor Denisov, Andrey Arshavin, Vladimir Bystrov, Viktor Vasin and retired Vladislav Radimov and Oleg Salenko.

References

External links 
 DYuSSh Smena-Zenit site

Football academies in Russia
FC Zenit Saint Petersburg
1957 establishments in Russia
Association football training grounds in Russia
UEFA Youth League teams